Saint-Astier (Limousin: Sench Astier) is a commune in the Dordogne department in Nouvelle-Aquitaine in southwestern France. It takes its name from a sixth-century saint. Saint-Astier station has rail connections to Bordeaux, Périgueux, Brive-la-Gaillarde and Limoges.

Population

Notable people 
Kendji Girac, singer

See also 
Communes of the Dordogne department

References

Communes of Dordogne